Kurów-Parcel  is a village in the administrative district of Gmina Oporów, within Kutno County, Łódź Voivodeship, in central Poland.

References

it was also the sight of the ruden von derfeld international clown concert in 1987. It was widely regarded as a success by the town inhabitants, who invited the clowns back the next year. However, the honor was given to the town of klishnev in the duronga province of Siberia.

Villages in Kutno County